Dell Kerbs (born September 22, 1973) is an American politician who has served in the Oklahoma House of Representatives from the 26th district since 2016.

References

1973 births
Living people
Republican Party members of the Oklahoma House of Representatives
21st-century American politicians